Monitor Valley is a valley in the U.S. state of Nevada.

History

References

External links
 

Valleys of Eureka County, Nevada
Valleys of Lander County, Nevada
Valleys of Nye County, Nevada